Victor is a 1951 French comedy-drama film directed by Claude Heymann and starring Jean Gabin, Françoise Christophe and Jacques Castelot.

Cast
In alphabetical order
 Brigitte Auber as Marianne  
 Jacques Castelot as Marc Pélicier  
 Françoise Christophe as Françoise Pélicier  
 Jacques Denoël as Le garçon de café 
 Jean Gabin as Victor  
 Camille Guérini as Gratien  
 René Hell 
 Gaston Modot as Le patron du café  
 Pierre Mondy as Un détenu  
 Jacques Morel as Jacques Genoust  
 Liane Morice
 Jane Morlet as La concierge  
 Jean-Paul Moulinot as Le directeur de la banque

References

Bibliography 
 Goble, Alan. The Complete Index to Literary Sources in Film. Walter de Gruyter, 1999.

External links 
 

1951 films
French drama films
1951 drama films
1950s French-language films
Films directed by Claude Heymann
French films based on plays
French black-and-white films
1950s French films